The 2016 Baltic Cup was the 26th football competition for men's national football teams organised by the Baltic states. The tournament, held between 29 May and 4 June 2016, was hosted in Estonia, Latvia and Lithuania, and was won by Latvia.

Standings

Matches

Winners

Statistics

Goalscorers

See also
Balkan Cup
Nordic Football Championship
2011 Nations Cup

References

External links

Baltic Cup (football)
Baltic Cup
Baltic Cup
Baltic Cup